Eburia aegrota is a species of beetle in the family Cerambycidae, that can be found in Mexico and Nicaragua.

References

aegrota
Beetles described in 1880